Jennifer Derevjanik (born March 29, 1982, in Staten Island, New York) is a former American professional basketball player. She last played the point guard position for the Phoenix Mercury in the WNBA. She currently coaches girl's varsity basketball at Bound Brook High School where she led them to their first state title in their programs history in her third year of coaching.

Derevjanik played college basketball at George Mason University, and was among the top five scorers in the university's history.

George Mason statistics
Source

International career 
In the 2004–2005, 2005-2006 off-season she played for Vilnius, Lithuania in the FIBA Euroleague.
In the 2010-2011 off-season she is playing for Panathinaikos of Greece.

WNBA career 
Derevjanik was undrafted.  She was signed by the Connecticut Sun on April 26, 2004. She was released by the Sun at the end of training camp prior to the 2006 season, and signed with the Phoenix Mercury a few weeks later.

Vital statistics
Position: Guard
Height: 5 ft. 10 in. / 1.78 m
College: George Mason University
Team(s): Phoenix Mercury, Connecticut Sun (WNBA)

References

External links
 Stats at basketball-reference
 WNBA biography

1982 births
Living people
American women's basketball players
Basketball players from New York City
Connecticut Sun players
George Mason Patriots women's basketball players
Panathinaikos WBC players
Phoenix Mercury players
Point guards
Sportspeople from Staten Island
Undrafted Women's National Basketball Association players